Awakening the World is the debut album of the heavy metal band Lost Horizon, released in 2001.

Track listing

Personnel
Transcendental Protagonist (Wojtek Lisicki) - guitars
Cosmic Antagonist (Martin Furängen) - bass
Preternatural Transmogrifyer (Christian Nyquist) - drums
Ethereal Magnanimus (Daniel Heiman) - vocals

Notes 

2001 debut albums